Suçatı can refer to:

 Suçatı, Acıpayam
 Suçatı, Mut